Keiichi Miki is a former international table tennis player from Japan.

Table tennis career
In 1962 and 1966 he won several medals in singles, doubles, and team events in the Asian Games.

He won three World Championship medals; one silver medal in the team event, one bronze medal in the doubles  with Ken Konaka and another silver in the mixed doubles with Masako Seki.

See also
 List of table tennis players
 List of World Table Tennis Championships medalists

References

Japanese male table tennis players
Asian Games medalists in table tennis
Table tennis players at the 1962 Asian Games
Table tennis players at the 1966 Asian Games
Asian Games gold medalists for Japan
Asian Games bronze medalists for Japan
Medalists at the 1962 Asian Games
Medalists at the 1966 Asian Games
Living people
Year of birth missing (living people)
Place of birth missing (living people)